Aleksandr Alekseyevich Cherkes (born 2 September 1976) is a Russian football coach and a former player.

Playing career
He made his debut in the Russian Premier League in 2000 for FC Fakel Voronezh.

On 17 June 2008, Cherkes signed a 2.5-year contract with FC Rostov.

Personal life
His son Yevgeni Cherkes is now a professional footballer.

References

External links
 
  Profile on the FC Rostov site

1976 births
Footballers from Voronezh
Living people
Russian footballers
Association football defenders
FC Fakel Voronezh players
FC Chernomorets Novorossiysk players
FC Luch Vladivostok players
FC Shinnik Yaroslavl players
FC Rostov players
FC Sokol Saratov players
Russian Premier League players
FC Nizhny Novgorod (2007) players
Russian football managers
FC Lokomotiv Moscow players